"Pass the Peas" is a 1972 funk instrumental by The J.B.'s. Released as a single on People Records, it charted #29 R&B and #95 Pop. It was included on the 1972 album Food for Thought.

Personnel
Credits per liner notes by Alan Leeds.
Jerone "Jasaan" Sanford – trumpet
Russell Crimes – trumpet
Fred Wesley – trombone
Jimmy Parker  – alto saxophone
St. Clair Pinckney – tenor saxophone
James Brown – organ
Robert Coleman – guitar
Hearlon "Cheese" Martin – guitar
Fred Thomas – bass
John "Jabo" Starks – drums
Bobby Roach – spoken introduction 
Bobby Byrd – spoken introduction
The entire band – vocals

References

The J.B.'s songs
Songs written by James Brown
1970s instrumentals
1972 singles